In American football, the upback (also known as the punt protector or personal protector) is a blocking back who lines up approximately 1–3 yards behind the line of scrimmage in punting situations.

Because the punter plays so far back, the upback frequently makes the line calls and calls for the snap to be received by the punter. Their primary role is to act as the last line of defense for the punter. Upbacks may occasionally receive the snap instead of the punter on fake punts. Upbacks receiving the snap normally run the ball, but they may throw it. An upback is typically played by a back-up for another position, mostly a linebacker, running back, or a fullback. This position is usually referred to simply as a special teamer, or even a gunner (though that word is used more often for a different position). A notable upback is Nate Ebner, formerly of the New England Patriots. A former rugby union player, Ebner uses his versatility in order to execute fake punts and protect the punter.

References

American football positions